= Rectangular Stadium =

Rectangular Stadium may refer to:

- Melbourne Rectangular Stadium or AAMI Park
- Perth Rectangular Stadium or HBF Park
